José Luis Junior Nuñez Julca (born 28 July 1989 in Barranca) is a Peruvian football defensive midfielder, currently playing for Cienciano.

Career
When he started, he played as offensive midfielder, then in Sport Boys he started to play as defensive midfielder. In 2008, he was promoted to the first team by Jacinto Rodriguez. In 2009, he signed with Universitario de Deportes, but he was loaned because he didn't have opportunities.

External links
Profile at BDFA

1989 births
Living people
People from Lima Region
Association football midfielders
Peruvian footballers
Sport Boys footballers
Club Universitario de Deportes footballers
Cienciano footballers
Peruvian Primera División players